Princess Ludwig Rudolph of Hanover (born Countess Isabella Maria von Thurn und Valsássina-Como-Vercelli, 12 December 1962 – 29 November 1988) was an Austrian model, socialite, and noblewoman. She was a princess of the House of Hanover through her marriage to Prince Ludwig Rudolph of Hanover. She died of a drug overdose in 1988, which reportedly led to her husband's suicide later that day.

Biography 
Isabella was born on 12 December 1962. She was the daughter of Count Ariprand Raimund von Thurn und Valsássina-Como-Vercelli (1925-1996) and Princess Maria Perpetua Euphemia von Auersperg (b. 1929), both members of the defunct Austrian high nobility. By birth she was a member of the Thurn und Valsassina family, a cadet branch of the Princely House of Thurn und Taxis that were made Imperial counts of the Holy Roman Empire in 1541 by Charles V. She worked as a fashion model before getting married. She spent her childhood between Burg Bleiburg and Castle Hagenegg, which were both owned by her family.

Marriage and family
She married Prince Ludwig Rudolph of Hanover on 4 October 1987 at her family's castle in Bleiburg. Isabella and Ludwig were distantly related (7th cousins), both sharing descent from Charles Alexander, Duke of Württemberg and his wife, Princess Marie Auguste of Thurn and Taxis.  The couple had one son, Prince Otto Heinrich Ariprand Georg Johannes Ernst August Vinzenz Egmont Franz of Hanover, who was born on 13 February 1988 in Gmunden.

Death
On 29 November 1988 the princess was found dead in her bedroom at her home in Gmunden following a suspected drug overdose. Authorities announced her death was likely caused from a cocaine overdose. Later that day her husband shot himself. They were buried together in Grunau im Almtal, Austria. Their orphaned son, Prince Otto was raised by his maternal grandparents.

References 

1962 births
1988 deaths
Austrian countesses
Austrian female models
Austrian socialites
Austrian people of Italian descent
Drug-related deaths in Austria
Hanoverian princesses by marriage
Isabella